Strolling players were  travelling theatre groups in England during the Tudor and subsequent periods. They toured the country delivering theatrical performances. They performed in barns and in the courtyards of inns. One of the most popular plays performed by these strolling players was Robin Hood.

The English government of the period was concerned that plays such as Robin Hood would promote rebellious acts. The emergence of the Black Death also increased fear that the strolling players would be responsible for spreading disease. The strolling players were subsequently banned in 1572. The only actors allowed to perform around the country were those who were employed by noblemen.

References

Acting
Tudor England